Underneath is the fourth studio album by The Verve Pipe, released in 2001. Produced by Adam Schlesinger, the album's power-pop sound was a departure from the darker, textured sonics of The Verve Pipe and Villains. "Never Let You Down", the album's lead single, was one of the Top 50 Most Played songs for Adult Top 40 and Modern A/C radio in 2001.

The song "Colorful" appears in a 2001 movie Rock Star in which lead singer Brian Vander Ark provided a singing voice for Mark Wahlberg's title character with this song and portrayed as Ricki Bell, a bassist for a fictional band Blood Pollution.

Critical reception
Billboard praised the album's turn to "power-pop territory," and wrote that singer Brian Vander Ark "has never sounded more like Peter Gabriel, and we mean that in a good way." The South Bend Tribune wrote that "Vander Ark writes five of the songs on Underneath, and drummer Donny Brown writes four of them, and the differences between them help to make Underneath a constantly shifting tilt of emotions and, probably, a much better album than if just one of them had been the main songwriter." The Detroit Free Press called the album "the best stuff the group has concocted in half a decade."

Track listing
"Only Words" (Vander Ark)
"Never Let You Down"(Brown)
"I Want All of You" (Brown and Schlesinger)
"Miles Away" (Vander Ark)
"Happiness Is" (Brown)
"Medicate Myself" (Brown)
"Gotta Move On" (Brown)
"Local Boys" (Vander Ark)
"Colorful" (Vander Ark)
"Wonderful Waste" (Vander Ark and Schlesinger)
"Underneath" (Vander Ark)

References

The Verve Pipe albums
2001 albums
Albums produced by Adam Schlesinger